The Caribbean Broadcasting Corporation (CBC) is a public radio and television broadcaster, located in The Pine, St. Michael in Barbados. It was founded in 1963 as Radio Barbados. The CBC falls under the ministry and jurisdiction of the Prime Minister's Office.

The television service broadcasts on channel 8 and is the only legally licensed, over-the-air television channel broadcasting in the country of Barbados. The corporation also owns and operates three radio stations: CBC Radio on 94.7 MHz FM and 900 kHz AM, The One on 98.1 MHz FM and Q-100.7 on 100.7 MHz FM.

Besides the terrestrial television and radio, the CBC operates a wireless Cable TV subscription service called Multi-Choice TV (MCTV) which offers many television stations from around the globe, including the United States, Canada, Europe, the Caribbean, and Latin America.

CBC's studios and offices are located North of Wildey at The Pine, Saint Michael.  The television broadcast transmitter is located at the Cave Hill Campus of the University of the West Indies (Lazaretto, Black Rock), however, it will soon be replaced by a transmitter at The Belle, St. Michael. The television broadcast is provided in the NTSC television format.

In 2003 it was announced the corporation would be transformed into a publicly-owned station with the aim of issuance of shares on the Barbados Stock Exchange.

In August 2006, chairman, Sonwabo Funde of the South African Broadcasting Corporation (SABC) reportedly held discussions with Barbadian government officials with the aim of forming a partnership or acquiring a stake in the CBC.

In early January 2007, CBC had broadcast its sponsorships and TV broadcaster CBC TV 8 for the hosting of the ICC Cricket World Cup West Indies 2007 here in Barbados from New Year's Day, 1 January to National Heroes' Day, 28 April 2007 during live broadcast at the Kensington Oval, Fontabelle, St. Michael, from 11 to 21 and 28 April 2007 with the West Indies, Barbados, Grenada, St. Lucia, Guyana, Trinidad and Tobago, Antigua and Jamaica vs. England, India, Australia and New Zealand.

In 2012 as part of a campaign promise the Barbados Labour Party's leader, Owen Arthur stated if his party wins the upcoming general election, the CBC could become privatised under that party's plan to reform the Barbadian Government.

The CBC is a member of: the Caribbean Broadcast Media Partnership on HIV/AIDS, the Caribbean Cable & Telecommunications Association, the Commonwealth Broadcasting Association within the Commonwealth of Nations, and the Public Media Alliance.

CBC had started its Countdown to 50 Years of Independence from 1 December 2015 to Independence Day, 30 November 2016 with the Government and the People of Barbados.

In 2019 the Caribbean Broadcasting Corporation (Amendment) Bill, 2019 was passed by Parliament transforming the post of General Manager into CEO.

CBC had also started its Barbados Vision 2020 We Gatherin' from New Year's Day, 1 January to New Year's Eve 31 December 2020 for eleven parishes and the country of Barbados, but was subsequently stopped showing it on TV because of the spread of the SARS-CoV-2 coronavirus pandemic (COVID-19).

Mandate 
The Caribbean Broadcasting Corporation Act, (1963). was enacted...
...to provide, in accordance with this Act, broadcasting services of high quality both as to the transmission and as to the matter transmitted.

The functions of the corporation as outlined in the act are: To have the powers-
 to erect, maintain and operate broadcasting, transmitting, relay and receiving stations;
 to arrange for the provision and equipment of, or, if need be, themselves to provide and equip, studios and other premises for broadcasting purposes;
 to make arrangements for the distribution of programmes broadcast by the corporation and to receive programmes to be broadcast by the corporation;
 to do such things as are necessary or expedient for the purpose of turning to account any property or rights of the corporation.

Television 
CBC TV 8 - Sturges, St. Thomas transmitter

Radio 
CBC Radio Hits 94.7 FM & 900 AM
The ONE 98.1
Quality 100.7 FM

Leadership

General Managers 
 Dr. Allyson Leacock, 2002 – 2006
 Austin Clark, 1975 – 1977
 Ian Gale, – 1974
 Doug Hoyte, 2016 – 2019 
 Sherwood McCaskie (acting), 2019 – 2020
 Melba Smith, 1995 – 2001
 Lars G.O. Söderström, 2008 – 2011
 Samuel Taitt, 1986 – 1994
 Paul S. Watson, 1963 -

Chief Executive Officers 
 Mr. Sanka Price, 2020 – Present

See also 
 CaribVision
 Public Broadcast Service
 List of cricket commentators
 List of radio stations in Barbados

References

External links 
 
 Linked in profile

 
1963 establishments in Barbados
Communications in Barbados
Government agencies of Barbados
Publicly funded broadcasters
Radio stations established in 1963
Saint Michael, Barbados
State media
Statutory boards of the Barbados Government
Television channels and stations established in 1964
Television in Barbados